Conton may refer to:
 Conton family (Sierra Leone)
 Bertha Conton (1923–2022), Sierra Leonean educator
 William Farquhar Conton (1925–2003), Sierra Leonean educator
 Attilio Conton (1902–1997), Italian runner

See also 
 Contern, a village in Luxembourg
 Konton, a 2011 music album